Andy Kwong also known as Ting Wo Kwong is a Hong Kong cinematographer. He was nominated for the 2002 Hong Kong Film Award for Best Cinematography for his work in Shaolin Soccer (2001).  He has been active in the cinema industry since 1979, and directed several commercials beginning in 2004. He is also a board member of the Hong Kong Society of Cinematographers and a judge for the Hong Kong Film Awards.

Filmography

As lighting director

As director of cinematography
Television

Music videos and commercials

Movies

As director

References

External links

Filmography
British Film Institute page

Living people
Hong Kong cinematographers
Year of birth missing (living people)